Fúlvio Chiantia de Assis is a Brazilian-Italian professional basketball player currently with the NBB team Bauru. He plays at the point guard (play maker) position.

Professional career
De Assis has played professional basketball in Brazil, Italy, and Spain and has represented Brazil's national basketball team on several occasions. During his time with São José, he became a fan favorite.

National team career
De Assis has been a member of the senior Brazilian national basketball team. He played at the 2017 FIBA AmeriCup.

Novo Basquete Brasil statistics

Regular season

Playoffs

Achievements and awards

Individual
4× All-NBB Team: (2010, 2012, 2013, 2017)
3× NBB All-Star Game: (2010, 2012, 2013)

References

External links
FIBA Profile
Latinbasket.com Profile
Spanish League Profile 
NBB Profile 

1981 births
Living people
Associação Bauru Basketball players
Brazilian men's basketball players
CB Granada players
Club Athletico Paulistano basketball players
CR Vasco da Gama basketball players
Clube Atlético Campestre de Assis basketball players
Franca Basquetebol Clube players
Italian men's basketball players
Liga ACB players
Novo Basquete Brasil players
Point guards
Roseto Sharks players
São José Basketball players
Sport Club Corinthians Paulista basketball players
Basketball players from São Paulo
UniCEUB/BRB players
Unitri/Uberlândia basketball players